Catalogue d'oiseaux ("Catalogue of birds") is a work for piano solo by Olivier Messiaen consisting of thirteen pieces, written between October 1956 and September 1958. It is devoted to birds and dedicated to his second wife Yvonne Loriod.

Premiere 
The work was premiered by Yvonne Loriod on 15 April 1959 in Paris, Salle Gaveau, for the concerts of the "Domaine musical" organized by Pierre Boulez.

Aim of the work 
For these pieces, Messiaen did not want to be limited to the evocation of the bird of which each of it bears the title.

Title of the pieces 

1 - The Alpine chough (Chocard des Alpes)

__
2 - The Eurasian golden oriole (Loriot d'Europe)

__
3 - The Blue rock thrush (Merle bleu)

__

4 - The Western black-eared wheatear (Traquet stapazin)

__

5 - The Tawny owl (Chouette hulotte)

__

6 - The Woodlark (Alouette lulu)

__

7 - The Eurasian reed warbler (Rousserolle effarvatte)

__

8 - The Greater short-toed lark (Alouette calandrelle)

__

9 - The Cetti's warbler (Bouscarle de Cetti)

__

10 - The Common rock thrush (Merle de roche)

__

11 - The Common buzzard (Buse variable)

__

12 - The Black wheatear (Traquet rieur)

__

13 - The Eurasian curlew (Courlis cendré)

Recordings 
Yvonne Loriod: Erato Records 2292-45505-2/VI; ECD 71590 (1970-1973)
Peter Hill: Regis B000Q7RKW8 (1986)
Anatol Ugorski: Deutsche Grammophon 4743452 (1994)
Hakon Austbo: Naxos Records 8.553532.34 (1997),  Also includes Petites esquisses d'oiseaux (composed in 1985).
Paul Kim: Centaur Records CRC 2567/68/69 (2001), Also includes La Fauvette des jardins and Petites esquisses d'oiseaux
Roger Muraro: Accord 4657682 (2002)
Pierre-Laurent Aimard: Pentatone PTC 5186670 (2018)
Carl-Axel Dominique BIS BIS-CD-594/596 Also includes "La Favuette des jardins" and "Petites esquisses d'oiseaux".

See also 
List of compositions by Olivier Messiaen

References

External links 
 Catalogue d'oiseaux in Les Inrockuptibles
 Three tracks on Gallica
 Catalogue d'oiseaux on Naxos
 Messiaen Catalogue d'oiseaux on Gramophone
 Olivier Messiaen, Catalogue d'oiseaux (in 7 books), for piano, I/42 (1956-1958) (Håkon Austbø, piano)  on YouTube
 First Book
 I. Le chocard des alpes (The Alpine chough)
 II. Le loriot (The Eurasian golden oriole)
 III. Le merle bleu (The Blue rock thrush)
 Second Book
 IV. Le traquet stapazin (The Black-eared wheatear)
 Third Book
 V.-VI.  La chouette hulotte & L'alouette-lulu (The Tawny owl & The Woodlark)
Fourth Book
VII. Le rousserolle effarvatte part 1 (The Eurasian reed warbler)
VII. Le rousserolle effarvatte part 2
Fifth Book
VIII. L'alouette calandrelle (The Greater short-toed lark)
IX. La bouscarle (The Cetti's warbler)
Sixth Book
X. Le merle de roche part 1 (The Common rock thrush)
X. Le merle de roche part 2
Seventh Book
XI. La buse variable (The Common buzzard)
XII. La traquet rieur (The Black wheatear)
XIII. Le courlis cendré (The Eurasian curlew)

Catalogue d'oiseaux
Catalogue d'oiseaux
Catalogue d'oiseaux
Music about birds